Mule or Mules is a surname which may refer to:

Mule
 Francesco Mulè (1926–1984), Italian film actor
 Giuseppe Mulè (1885–1951), Italian composer and conductor, father of Francesco Mulé
 Marcel Mule (1901–2001), classical saxophonist

Mules
 Charles Mules (1837–1927), third Anglican Bishop of Nelson, New Zealand
 Horace Charles Mules, Commissioner in Sind, British India, from 1903 to 1904
 John W. H. Mules, after whom the practice of Mulesing is named